The Odell S. Williams Now And Then African-American History Museum or the Baton Rouge African-American Museum, is a non-profit museum of African-American history and heritage located in Baton Rouge, Louisiana, United States. The museum is named for Odell S. Williams, an educator in Baton Rouge, Louisiana. Founded by Sadie Roberts-Joseph in 2001, the museum remains the only museum dedicated to African and African American history in the city. The museum celebrates Juneteenth, Black History Month, and American history year round.

History
Sadie Roberts-Joseph, curator and founder, established the African American Museum after seeing the need and importance of having it in the community. She often told visitors, "Culture is the glue that holds a people together. Take a step back in time and leap into your future."

Roberts-Joseph maintained the museum on her own from its founding until her death in 2019. After her death, her son Jason and his sister took over the management. The museum closed for a short time for COVID-19, but reopened in time for Juneteenth 2020. It receives no federal or local funding.

See also
List of museums focused on African Americans
Rural African American Museum, Opelousas

References

External links

African-American history in Baton Rouge, Louisiana
Louisiana African American Heritage Trail
History of Louisiana
African-American museums in Louisiana
History museums in Louisiana
Museums
Cultural infrastructure completed in 2001
Museums established in 2001